Bilgen is a Turkish surname, related to the name Bilge, meaning wise.

Notable people with this name include:
 İbrahim Bilgen (1949–2010) was a Turkish politician
 Samim Bilgen (1910–2005), Turkish violinist
 Üstün Bilgen-Reinart (born 1947), Turkish-Canadian writer

See also
 Bilge, Turkish given name